Brant Bjork & the Operators is the second solo album by desert rocker Brant Bjork. Although titled Brant Bjork and the Operators, Bjork sings and plays most instruments on the album. He is joined by friends Mathias Schneeberger and Mario Lalli to lend guitar and vocals. This was Duna Records first release.

This album was reissued on vinyl in 2008 as a double LP by Bjork's Low Desert Punk label, and again in 2022 by Bjork's current label, Heavy Psych Sounds Records.

Track listing

Reception
Reviews were mostly positive, with AllMusic declaring "all of the above experiments come off so effortlessly original and organic that despite occasional misfires [...] one has to tip his or her hat to Bjork's purely musical instincts." Exclaim! appreciated the quieter and varied nature of the album, as well as promoting it as a "gem that makes the hours wading through musical sewage worth it".

Credits
Brant Bjork: vocals, guitars, bass, and drums

Mathias Schneeberger: keyboards, * additional guitars

Produced & Engineered by Mathias Schneeberger

Guitar leads on "Electric Lalli Land" by Mario Lalli

Backing Vocals on "Captain Lovestar" by Franz Stahl

Princess Lovestar by Debbie

Handclaps on "My Ghettoblaster" by the low desert punks

Notes
 "My Ghettoblaster" is Bjork's first single to have a music video.
 "Electric Lalli Land" is a reference to Jimi Hendrix's album Electric Ladyland. The song features Mario Lalli on guitar.

References

Brant Bjork albums
2002 albums